Sofiane Daid (born 6 November 1982) is a two-time Olympic breaststroke swimmer from Algeria. He swam for Algeria at the 2004 and 2008 Olympics.

He has swum for Algeria at the:
Olympics: 2004, 2008
All-Africa Games: 2003, 2007, 2011
Mediterranean Games: 2005
World Championships: 2005, 2007, 2009, 2011
African Championships: 2006, 2010

References
 juegosmediterraneos
sports-reference

1982 births
Living people
Algerian male swimmers
Male breaststroke swimmers
Swimmers at the 2004 Summer Olympics
Swimmers at the 2008 Summer Olympics
Olympic swimmers of Algeria
Sportspeople from Tizi Ouzou
Mediterranean Games bronze medalists for Algeria
Swimmers at the 2005 Mediterranean Games
African Games gold medalists for Algeria
African Games medalists in swimming
African Games silver medalists for Algeria
African Games bronze medalists for Algeria
Mediterranean Games medalists in swimming
Competitors at the 2007 All-Africa Games
Competitors at the 2011 All-Africa Games
21st-century Algerian people